The Striker with Number 9 (translit. I fanela me to 9) is a 1989 Greek drama film directed by Pantelis Voulgaris. It was entered into the 39th Berlin International Film Festival. It is based on the novel by Menis Koumandareas and the screenplay was written by Vangelis Raptopoulos.

Cast
 Stratos Tzortzoglou as Bill Seretis
 Themis Bazaka as Kiki
 Nikos Bousdoukos as Giorgos Kapatos
 Stamatis Jelepis as Spyros
 Katia Sperelaki as Dora
 Nikos Tsachiridis as Tsalikis
 Kostas Kleftogiannis
 Anna Avgoula as Eva
 Stavros Kalaroglou
 Zano Danias
 Vangelis Pantazis
 Giannis Tsoubris
 Giannis Hatzigiannis
 Vasilis Vlahos
 Thanasis Mylonas as Votsis

References

External links

1989 films
1989 drama films
Greek drama films
1980s Greek-language films
Films directed by Pantelis Voulgaris